Matteo Orsini may refer to:

Matteo Rosso Orsini (1178–1246), Roman senator
Matteo Rosso Orsini (cardinal) (1262–1305)
Matteo Orsini (died 1340), Dominican friar and cardinal
Matteo Orsini (bishop) (died 1512)